Jiahe may refer to:

 Jiahe County, a county of Chenzhou, Hunan Province, China
 Jiahe Subdistrict, Guangzhou, a subdistrict of Baiyun District, Guangzhou, Guangdong Province, China
 Jiahe Subdistrict, Suining, a subdistrict of Chuanshan District, Suining, Sichuan Province, China
 Ancient name of Jiaxing, Zhejiang Province, China
 Sun Quan's third era name

See also
 Jiaohe (disambiguation)